Tortilla soup is a traditional Mexican soup made of fried corn tortilla pieces, submerged into a broth of tomato, garlic, onion, and chile de árbol and epazote. It is served with pieces of pasilla chiles, chicharrón, avocado, fresh cheese cubes and sour cream. Although the exact origin of tortilla soup is unknown, it is known that it comes from the Mexico City area in Mexico. Traditional tortilla soup is made with chicken broth combined with roasted tomatoes, onion, garlic, chiles and tortillas, cut into strips and fried. There are some variations, for example the broth being made with a thickened tomato base and ground tortillas or a bean soup enriched with crunchy strips of fried tortillas.

See also

 List of soups

Further reading
 Peralta, Chepina (2003). Cocinando en microondas. Editorial Limusa, 2003. . Consultado el 5 de marzo de 2012.

References

Mexican soups
Tortilla-based dishes